Than is a grammatical particle of the English language.

Than may also refer to:
Than, Gujarat, a town in Gujarat, India
Than, Kandi Dholran, a village in Himachal Pradesh, India

People with the name 
Carl von Than (1834-1908), Hungarian chemist
Mór Than (1828-1899), Hungarian painter
Than (politician), Burmese politician
Than E (1908-2007), Burmese singer
Than Sina, Cambodian politician elected to the National Assembly in 2003
Ohn Than (born 1946), Burmese activist for democracy
Than Htay, Burmese government minister and retired brigadier general
Than Nyein (politician) (1937-2014), Burmese politician and doctor
Than Shwe (born 1933), Burmese politician and general
Than Tun (1923-2005): Burmese historian
Dinh Van Than, Vanuatan businessman and former politician
Nguyễn Hải Thần (1878-1959), Vietnamese revolutionary and military leader

See also

 Then (disambiguation)
 Thann (disambiguation)
 Thon (disambiguation)